Ardozyga obscura is a species of moth in the family Gelechiidae. It was described by Turner in 1933. It is found in Australia, where it has been recorded from Queensland.

References

Ardozyga
Moths described in 1933
Moths of Australia